Phosphoenolpyruvate carboxykinase (ATP) (phosphopyruvate carboxylase (ATP), phosphoenolpyruvate carboxylase, phosphoenolpyruvate carboxykinase, phosphopyruvate carboxykinase (adenosine triphosphate), PEP carboxylase, PEP carboxykinase, PEPCK (ATP), PEPK, PEPCK, phosphoenolpyruvic carboxylase, phosphoenolpyruvic carboxykinase, phosphoenolpyruvate carboxylase (ATP), phosphopyruvate carboxykinase, ATP:oxaloacetate carboxy-lyase (transphosphorylating)) is an enzyme with systematic name ATP:oxaloacetate carboxy-lyase (transphosphorylating; phosphoenolpyruvate-forming). This enzyme catalyses the following chemical reaction

 ATP + oxaloacetate  ADP + phosphoenolpyruvate + CO2

See also 
 Phosphoenolpyruvate carboxykinase

References

External links 
 

EC 4.1.1